Shokhuvi Railway Station, coded SHKV is a railway station in Chümoukedima District, Nagaland. It serves as a station for the eastern part of the Chümoukedima–Dimapur Metropolitan Area. The station consists of two platforms and three tracks. It is the first railway station opened on the Dhansiri–Zubza line.

See also
 Dhansiri–Zubza line
 Kohima Zubza Railway Station

References

Chümoukedima district
Lumding railway division
Railway stations in Nagaland
Transport in Chümoukedima
2021 establishments in Nagaland
Railway stations in India opened in 2021